Research on the heritability of IQ inquires into the degree of variation in IQ within a population that is due to genetic variation between individuals in that population. There has been significant controversy in the academic community about the heritability of IQ since research on the issue began in the late nineteenth century. Intelligence in the normal range is a polygenic trait, meaning that it is influenced by more than one gene, and in the case of intelligence at least 500 genes. Further, explaining the similarity in IQ of closely related persons requires careful study because environmental factors may be correlated with genetic factors.

Early twin studies of adult individuals have found a heritability of IQ between 57% and 73%, with some recent studies showing heritability for IQ as high as 80%. IQ goes from being weakly correlated with genetics for children, to being strongly correlated with genetics for late teens and adults. The heritability of IQ increases with the child's age and reaches a plateau at 18–20 years old, continuing at that level well into adulthood. However, poor prenatal environment, malnutrition and disease are known to have lifelong deleterious effects.

Although IQ differences between individuals have been shown to have a large hereditary component, it does not follow that disparities in IQ between groups have a genetic basis. The scientific consensus is that genetics does not explain average differences in IQ test performance between racial groups.

Heritability and caveats 

Heritability is a statistic used in the fields of breeding and genetics that estimates the degree of variation in a phenotypic trait in a population that is due to genetic variation between individuals in that population.  The concept of heritability can be expressed in the form of the following question: "What is the proportion of the variation in a given trait within a population that is not explained by the environment or random chance?"

Estimates of heritability take values ranging from 0 to 1; a heritability estimate of 1 indicates that all variation in the trait in question is genetic in origin and a heritability estimate of 0 indicates that none of the variation is genetic. The determination of many traits can be considered primarily genetic under similar environmental backgrounds. For example, a 2006 study found that adult height has a heritability estimated at 0.80 when looking only at the height variation within families where the environment should be very similar. Other traits have lower heritability estimates, which indicate a relatively larger environmental influence. For example, a twin study on the heritability of depression in men estimated it as 0.29, while it was 0.42 for women in the same study.

Caveats 
There are a number of points to consider when interpreting heritability:
 Heritability measures the proportion of variation in a trait that can be attributed to genes, and not the proportion of a trait caused by genes. Thus, if the environment relevant to a given trait changes in a way that affects all members of the population equally, the mean value of the trait will change without any change in its heritability (because the variation or differences among individuals in the population will stay the same). This has evidently happened for height: the heritability of stature is high, but average heights continue to increase. Thus, even in developed nations, a high heritability of a trait does not necessarily mean that average group differences are due to genes. Some have gone further, and used height as an example in order to argue that "even highly heritable traits can be strongly manipulated by the environment, so heritability has little if anything to do with controllability."
 A common error is to assume that a heritability figure is necessarily unchangeable. The value of heritability can change if the impact of environment (or of genes) in the population is substantially altered. If the environmental variation encountered by different individuals increases, then the heritability figure would decrease. On the other hand, if everyone had the same environment, then heritability would be 100%. The population in developing nations often has more diverse environments than in developed nations. This would mean that heritability figures would be lower in developing nations. Another example is phenylketonuria which previously caused mental retardation for everyone who had this genetic disorder and thus had a heritability of 100%. Today, this can be prevented by following a modified diet, resulting in a lowered heritability.
 A high heritability of a trait does not mean that environmental effects such as learning are not involved. Vocabulary size, for example, is very substantially heritable (and highly correlated with general intelligence) although every word in an individual's vocabulary is learned. In a society in which plenty of words are available in everyone's environment, especially for individuals who are motivated to seek them out, the number of words that individuals actually learn depends to a considerable extent on their genetic predispositions and thus heritability is high.
 Since heritability increases during childhood and adolescence, and even increases greatly between 16 and 20 years of age and adulthood, one should be cautious drawing conclusions regarding the role of genetics and environment from studies where the participants are not followed until they are adults. Furthermore, there may be differences regarding the effects on the g-factor and on non-g factors, with g possibly being harder to affect and environmental interventions disproportionately affecting non-g factors.
 Polygenic traits often appear less heritable at the extremes. A heritable trait is definitionally more likely to appear in the offspring of two parents high in that trait than in the offspring of two randomly selected parents. However, the more extreme the expression of the trait in the parents, the less likely the child is to display the same extreme as the parents. At the same time, the more extreme the expression of the trait in the parents, the more likely the child is to express the trait at all. For example, the child of two extremely tall parents is likely to be taller than the average person (displaying the trait), but unlikely to be taller than the two parents (displaying the trait at the same extreme). See also regression toward the mean.

Estimates 
Various studies have estimated the heritability of IQ to be between 0.7 and 0.8 in adults and 0.45 in childhood in the United States. It has been found that estimates of heritability increase as individuals age. Heritability estimates in infancy are as low as 0.2, around 0.4 in middle childhood, and as high as 0.8 in adulthood. The brain undergoes morphological changes in development which suggests that age-related physical changes could contribute to this effect.

A 1994 article in Behavior Genetics based on a study of Swedish monozygotic and dizygotic twins found the heritability of the sample to be as high as 0.80 in general cognitive ability; however, it also varies by trait, with 0.60 for verbal tests, 0.50 for spatial and speed-of-processing tests, and 0.40 for memory tests. In contrast, studies of other populations estimate an average heritability of 0.50 for general cognitive ability.

In 2006, David Kirp, writing in The New York Times Magazine, summarized a century's worth of research as follows, "about three-quarters of I.Q. differences between individuals are attributable to heredity."

Shared family environment 

There are some family effects on the IQ of children, accounting for up to a quarter of the variance. However, adoption studies show that by adulthood adoptive siblings aren't more similar in IQ than strangers, while adult full siblings show an IQ correlation of 0.24. However, some studies of twins reared apart (e.g. Bouchard, 1990) find a significant shared environmental influence, of at least 10% going into late adulthood. Judith Rich Harris suggests that this might be due to biasing assumptions in the methodology of the classical twin and adoption studies.

There are aspects of environments that family members have in common (for example, characteristics of the home). This shared family environment accounts for 0.25-0.35 of the variation in IQ in childhood. By late adolescence it is quite low (zero in some studies). There is a similar effect for several other psychological traits. These studies have not looked into the effects of extreme environments such as in abusive families.

The American Psychological Association's report "Intelligence: Knowns and Unknowns" (1996) states that there is no doubt that normal child development requires a certain minimum level of responsible care. Severely deprived, neglectful, or abusive environments must have negative effects on a great many aspects of development, including intellectual aspects. Beyond that minimum, however, the role of family experience is in serious dispute. There is no doubt that such variables as resources of the home and parents' use of language are correlated with children's IQ scores, but such correlations may be mediated by genetic as well as (or instead of) environmental factors. But how much of that variance in IQ results from differences between families, as contrasted with the varying experiences of different children in the same family? Recent twin and adoption studies suggest that while the effect of the shared family environment is substantial in early childhood, it becomes quite small by late adolescence. These findings suggest that differences in the life styles of families whatever their importance may be for many aspects of children's lives make little long-term difference for the skills measured by intelligence tests.

Non-shared family environment and environment outside the family 
Although parents treat their children differently, such differential treatment explains only a small amount of non-shared environmental influence. One suggestion is that children react differently to the same environment due to different genes. More likely influences may be the impact of peers and other experiences outside the family. For example, siblings grown up in the same household may have different friends and teachers and even contract different illnesses. This factor may be one of the reasons why IQ score correlations between siblings decreases as they get older.

Malnutrition and diseases 

Certain single-gene metabolic disorders can severely affect intelligence. Phenylketonuria is an example, with publications demonstrating the capacity of phenylketonuria to produce a reduction of 10 IQ points on average. Meta-analyses have found that environmental factors, such as iodine deficiency, can result in large reductions in average IQ; iodine deficiency has been shown to produce a reduction of 12.5 IQ points on average.

Heritability and socioeconomic status 
The APA report "Intelligence: Knowns and Unknowns" (1996) also stated that: "We should note, however, that low-income and non-white families are poorly represented in existing adoption studies as well as in most twin samples. Thus it is not yet clear whether these studies apply to the population as a whole. It remains possible that, across the full range of income and ethnicity, between-family differences have more lasting consequences for psychometric intelligence."

A study (1999) by Capron and Duyme of French children adopted between the ages of four and six examined the influence of socioeconomic status (SES). The children's IQs initially averaged 77, putting them near retardation. Most were abused or neglected as infants, then shunted from one foster home or institution to the next. Nine years later after adoption, when they were on average 14 years old, they retook the IQ tests, and all of them did better. The amount they improved was directly related to the adopting family's socioeconomic status. "Children adopted by farmers and laborers had average IQ scores of 85.5; those placed with middle-class families had average scores of 92. The average IQ scores of youngsters placed in well-to-do homes climbed more than 20 points, to 98."

Stoolmiller (1999) argued that the range of environments in previous adoption studies was restricted. Adopting families tend to be more similar on, for example, socio-economic status than the general population, which suggests a possible underestimation of the role of the shared family environment in previous studies. Corrections for range restriction to adoption studies indicated that socio-economic status could account for as much as 50% of the variance in IQ.

On the other hand, the effect of this was examined by Matt McGue and colleagues (2007), who wrote that "restriction in range in parent disinhibitory psychopathology and family socio-economic status had no effect on adoptive-sibling correlations [in] IQ"

Turkheimer and colleagues (2003) argued that the proportions of IQ variance attributable to genes and environment vary with socioeconomic status. They found that in a study on seven-year-old twins, in impoverished families, 60% of the variance in early childhood IQ was accounted for by the shared family environment, and the contribution of genes is close to zero; in affluent families, the result is almost exactly the reverse.

In contrast to Turkheimer (2003), a study by Nagoshi and Johnson (2005) concluded that the heritability of IQ did not vary as a function of parental socioeconomic status in the 949 families of Caucasian and 400 families of Japanese ancestry who took part in the Hawaii Family Study of Cognition.

Asbury and colleagues (2005) studied the effect of environmental risk factors on verbal and non-verbal ability in a nationally representative sample of 4-year-old British twins. There was not any statistically significant interaction for non-verbal ability, but the heritability of verbal ability was found to be higher in low-SES and high-risk environments.

Harden, Turkheimer, and Loehlin (2007) investigated adolescents, most 17 years old, and found that, among higher income families, genetic influences accounted for approximately 55% of the variance in cognitive aptitude and shared environmental influences about 35%. Among lower income families, the proportions were in the reverse direction, 39% genetic and 45% shared environment."

In the course of a substantial review, Rushton and Jensen (2010) criticized the study of Capron and Duyme, arguing their choice of IQ test and selection of child and adolescent subjects were a poor choice because this gives a relatively less hereditable measure. The argument here rests on a strong form of Spearman's hypothesis, that the hereditability of different kinds of IQ test can vary according to how closely they correlate to the general intelligence factor (g); both the empirical data and statistical methodology bearing on this question are matters of active controversy.

A 2011 study by Tucker-Drob and colleagues reported that at age 2, genes accounted for approximately 50% of the variation in mental ability for children being raised in high socioeconomic status families, but genes accounted for negligible variation in mental ability for children being raised in low socioeconomic status families. This gene–environment interaction was not apparent at age 10 months, suggesting that the effect emerges over the course of early development.

A 2012 study based on a representative sample of twins from the United Kingdom, with longitudinal data on IQ from age two to age fourteen, did not find evidence for lower heritability in low-SES families. However, the study indicated that the effects of shared family environment on IQ were generally greater in low-SES families than in high-SES families, resulting in greater variance in IQ in low-SES families. The authors noted that previous research had produced inconsistent results on whether or not SES moderates the heritability of IQ. They suggested three explanations for the inconsistency. First, some studies may have lacked statistical power to detect interactions. Second, the age range investigated has varied between studies. Third, the effect of SES may vary in different demographics and different countries.

A 2017 King's College London study suggests that genes account for nearly 50 per cent of the differences between whether children are socially mobile or not.

Maternal (fetal) environment 

A meta-analysis by Devlin and colleagues (1997) of 212 previous studies evaluated an alternative model for environmental influence and found that it fits the data better than the 'family-environments' model commonly used. The shared maternal (fetal) environment effects, often assumed to be negligible, account for 20% of covariance between twins and 5% between siblings, and the effects of genes are correspondingly reduced, with two measures of heritability being less than 50%. They argue that the shared maternal environment may explain the striking correlation between the IQs of twins, especially those of adult twins that were reared apart. IQ heritability increases during early childhood, but whether it stabilizes thereafter remains unclear. These results have two implications: a new model may be required regarding the influence of genes and environment on cognitive function; and interventions aimed at improving the prenatal environment could lead to a significant boost in the population's IQ.

Bouchard and McGue reviewed the literature in 2003, arguing that Devlin's conclusions about the magnitude of heritability is not substantially different from previous reports and that their conclusions regarding prenatal effects stands in contradiction to many previous reports. They write that: Chipuer et al. and Loehlin conclude that the postnatal rather than the prenatal environment is most important. The Devlin et al. (1997a) conclusion that the prenatal environment contributes to twin IQ similarity is especially remarkable given the existence of an extensive empirical literature on prenatal effects. Price (1950), in a comprehensive review published over 50 years ago, argued that almost all MZ twin prenatal effects produced differences rather than similarities. As of 1950 the literature on the topic was so large that the entire bibliography was not published. It was finally published in 1978 with an additional 260 references. At that time Price reiterated his earlier conclusion (Price, 1978). Research subsequent to the 1978 review largely reinforces Price's hypothesis (Bryan, 1993; Macdonald et al., 1993; Hall and Lopez-Rangel, 1996; see also Martin et al., 1997, box 2; Machin, 1996).

Dickens and Flynn model 

Dickens and Flynn (2001) argued that the "heritability" figure includes both a direct effect of the genotype on IQ and also indirect effects where the genotype changes the environment, in turn affecting IQ. That is, those with a higher IQ tend to seek out stimulating environments that further increase IQ. The direct effect can initially have been very small but feedback loops can create large differences in IQ. In their model an environmental stimulus can have a very large effect on IQ, even in adults, but this effect also decays over time unless the stimulus continues. This model could be adapted to include possible factors, like nutrition in early childhood, that may cause permanent effects.

The Flynn effect is the increase in average intelligence test scores by about 0.3% annually, resulting in the average person today scoring 15 points higher in IQ compared to the generation 50 years ago. This effect can be explained by a generally more stimulating environment for all people. The authors suggest that programs aiming to increase IQ would be most likely to produce long-term IQ gains if they taught children how to replicate outside the program the kinds of cognitively demanding experiences that produce IQ gains while they are in the program and motivate them to persist in that replication long after they have left the program.
Most of the improvements have allowed for better abstract reasoning, spatial relations, and comprehension. Some scientists have suggested that such enhancements are due to better nutrition, better parenting and schooling, as well as exclusion of the least intelligent people from reproduction. However, Flynn and a group of other scientists share the viewpoint that modern life implies solving many abstract problems which leads to a rise in their IQ scores.

Influence of genes on IQ stability 

Recent research has illuminated genetic factors underlying IQ stability and change. Genome-wide association studies have demonstrated that the genes involved in intelligence remain fairly stable over time. Specifically, in terms of IQ stability, "genetic factors mediated phenotypic stability throughout this entire period [age 0 to 16], whereas most age-to-age instability appeared to be due to non-shared environmental influences". These findings have been replicated extensively and observed in the United Kingdom, the United States, and the Netherlands. Additionally, researchers have shown that naturalistic changes in IQ occur in individuals at variable times.

Influence of parents genes that are not inherited 

Kong reports that, "Nurture has a genetic component, i.e. alleles in the parents affect the parents' phenotypes and through that influence the outcomes of the child." These results were obtained through a meta-analysis of educational attainment and polygenic scores of non-transmitted alleles. Although the study deals with educational attainment and not IQ, these two are strongly linked.

Spatial ability component of IQ 

Spatial ability has been shown to be unifactorial (a single score accounts well for all spatial abilities), and is 69% heritable in a sample of 1,367 pairs of twins from the ages 19 through 21. Further only 8% of spatial ability can be accounted for by shared environmental factors like school and family. Of the genetically determined portion of spatial ability, 24% is shared with verbal ability (general intelligence) and 43% was specific to spatial ability alone.

Molecular genetic investigations 

A 2009 review article identified over 50 genetic polymorphisms that have been reported to be associated with cognitive ability in various studies, but noted that the discovery of small effect sizes and lack of replication have characterized this research so far. Another study attempted to replicate 12 reported associations between specific genetic variants and general cognitive ability in three large datasets, but found that only one of the genotypes was significantly associated with general intelligence in one of the samples, a result expected by chance alone. The authors concluded that most reported genetic associations with general intelligence are probably false positives brought about by inadequate sample sizes. Arguing that common genetic variants explain much of the variation in general intelligence, they suggested that the effects of individual variants are so small that very large samples are required to reliably detect them. Genetic diversity within individuals is heavily correlated with IQ.

A novel molecular genetic method for estimating heritability calculates the overall genetic similarity (as indexed by the cumulative effects of all genotyped single nucleotide polymorphisms) between all pairs of individuals in a sample of unrelated individuals and then correlates this genetic similarity with phenotypic similarity across all the pairs. A study using this method estimated that the lower bounds for the narrow-sense heritability of crystallized and fluid intelligence are 40% and 51%, respectively. A replication study in an independent sample confirmed these results, reporting a heritability estimate of 47%. These findings are compatible with the view that a large number of genes, each with only a small effect, contribute to differences in intelligence.

Correlations between IQ and degree of genetic relatedness 
The relative influence of genetics and environment for a trait can be calculated by measuring how strongly traits covary in people of a given genetic (unrelated, siblings, fraternal twins, or identical twins) and environmental (reared in the same family or not) relationship. One method is to consider identical twins reared apart, with any similarities that exist between such twin pairs attributed to genotype. In terms of correlation statistics, this means that theoretically the correlation of tests scores between monozygotic twins would be 1.00 if genetics alone accounted for variation in IQ scores; likewise, siblings and dizygotic twins share on average half alleles and the correlation of their scores would be 0.50 if IQ were affected by genes alone (or greater if there is a positive correlation between the IQs of spouses in the parental generation). Practically, however, the upper bound of these correlations are given by the reliability of the test, which is 0.90 to 0.95 for typical IQ tests

If there is biological inheritance of IQ, then the relatives of a person with a high IQ should exhibit a comparably high IQ with a much higher probability than the general population. In 1982, Bouchard and McGue reviewed such correlations reported in 111 original studies in the United States. The mean correlation of IQ scores between monozygotic twins was 0.86, between siblings 0.47, between half-siblings 0.31, and between cousins 0.15.

The 2006 edition of Assessing adolescent and adult intelligence by Alan S. Kaufman and Elizabeth O. Lichtenberger reports correlations of 0.86 for identical twins raised together compared to 0.76 for those raised apart and 0.47 for siblings. These numbers are not necessarily static. When comparing pre-1963 to late 1970s data, researches DeFries and Plomin found that the IQ correlation between parent and child living together fell significantly, from 0.50 to 0.35. The opposite occurred for fraternal twins.

Every one of these studies presented next contains estimates of only two of the three factors which are relevant. The three factors are G, E, and GxE. Since there is no possibility of studying equal environments in a manner comparable to using identical twins for equal genetics, the GxE factor can not be isolated. Thus the estimates are actually of G+GxE and E. Although this may seem like nonsense, it is justified by the unstated assumption that GxE=0. It is also the case that the values shown below are r correlations and not r(squared), proportions of variance. Numbers less than one are smaller when squared. The next to last number in the list below refers to less than 5% shared variance between a parent and child living apart.

Another summary:

 Same person (tested twice over time) .85 or above
 Identical twins—Reared together .86
 Identical twins—Reared apart .76
 Fraternal twins—Reared together .55
 Fraternal twins—Reared apart .35
 Biological siblings—Reared together .47
 Biological siblings—Reared apart .24
 Biological siblings—Reared together—Adults .24
 Unrelated children—Reared together—Children .28
 Unrelated children—Reared together—Adults .04
 Cousins .15
 Parent-child—Living together .42
 Parent-child—Living apart .22
 Adoptive parent–child—Living together .19

Between-group heritability 

In the US, individuals identifying themselves as Asian generally tend to score higher on IQ tests than Caucasians, who tend to score higher than Hispanics, who tend to score higher than African Americans –– despite the fact that greater variation in IQ scores exists within each ethnic group than between them. Yet, although IQ differences between individuals have been shown to have a large hereditary component, it does not follow that between-group differences in average IQ have a genetic basis. The scientific consensus is that genetics does not explain average differences in IQ test performance between racial groups. Growing evidence indicates that environmental factors, not genetic ones, explain the racial IQ gap.

Arguments in support of a genetic explanation of racial differences in average IQ are sometimes fallacious. For instance, some hereditarians have cited as evidence the failure of known environmental factors to account for such differences, or the high heritability of intelligence within races. Jensen and Rushton, in their formulation of Spearman's Hypothesis, argued that cognitive tasks that have the highest g-load are the tasks in which the gap between black and white test takers is greatest, and that this supports their view that racial IQ gaps are in large part genetic. However, in separate reviews, Mackintosh, Nisbett et al. and Flynn have all concluded that the slight correlation between g-loading and the test score gap offers no clue to the cause of the gap. Further reviews of both adoption studies and racial admixture studies have also found no evidence for a genetic component behind group-level IQ differences. Hereditarian arguments for racial differences in IQ have been criticized from a theoretical point of view as well. For example, the geneticist and neuroscientist Kevin Mitchell has argued that "systematic genetic differences in intelligence between large, ancient populations" are "inherently and deeply implausible" because the "constant churn of genetic variation works against any long-term rise or fall in intelligence." As he argues, "To end up with systematic genetic differences in intelligence between large, ancient populations, the selective forces driving those differences would need to have been enormous. What's more, those forces would have to have acted across entire continents, with wildly different environments, and have been persistent over tens of thousands of years of tremendous cultural change."

In favor of an environmental explanation, on the other hand, numerous studies and reviews have shown promising results. Among these, some focus on the gradual closing of the black–white IQ gap over the last decades of the 20th century, as black test-takers increased their average scores relative to white test-takers. For instance, Vincent reported in 1991 that the black–white IQ gap was decreasing among children, but that it was remaining constant among adults. Similarly, a 2006 study by Dickens and Flynn estimated that the difference between mean scores of black people and white people closed by about 5 or 6 IQ points between 1972 and 2002, a reduction of about one-third. In the same period, the educational achievement disparity also diminished. Reviews by Flynn and Dickens, Mackintosh, and Nisbett et al. all accept the gradual closing of the gap as a fact. Other recent studies have focused on disparities in nutrition and prenatal care, as well as other health-related environmental disparities, and have found that these disparities may account for significant IQ gaps between population groups. Still other studies have focused on educational disparities, and have found that intensive early childhood education and test preparation can diminish or eliminate the black–white IQ test gap. In light of these and similar findings, a consensus has formed that genetics does not explain differences in average IQ test performance between racial groups.

See also

Notes and references

Further reading

Books

Review articles

Online articles

External links 

  Free Massively Open Online Course on human behavior genetics by Matt McGue of the University of Minnesota, including unit on genetics of human intelligence

Human genetics
Race and intelligence controversy
Factors related to intelligence
Medical genetics
Behavioural genetics
Intelligence quotient
Quantitative genetics